The HXD2 locomotives are a series of related locomotive classes built by CNR Datong Electric Locomotive and Alstom. The locomotives designs are based on the Alstom Prima electric locomotives, and are a product of a cooperation agreement signed  between the two companies in 2004. All locomotives are intended for heavy freight work, including coal trains on the Datong Qinhuangdao line (Daqin Railway).

The original HXD2 locomotives are twin unit Bo′Bo′+Bo′Bo′ vehicles whereas the HXD2B and HXD2C versions are single unit Co′Co′ machines.  At the time of their construction the HXD2 and HXD2B locomotives were amongst the most powerful locomotives in the world.  The HXD2C is similarly specified to the HXD2B but of reduced power, and with increased localisation of components for lower cost.

The HXD2 was originally described as the DJ4-6000 class.

Variants of the type were produced for railways other than China Railway: in 2010 Belarus state railways ordered a HXD2 twin unit locomotive variant (BCG-1); and in 2012 Shenhua Group also ordered twin section locomotives.

In 2012 CNR Datong announced a new sub-version of the HXD2 class, built using fully localised production; the HXD2-1000 series. In 2014 a new localised variant, in 2(Bo′Bo′) wheel arrangement and 9.6MW power, with axle load of 27tonnes (up to 30 tonnes on specialised line) was unveiled, designated HXD2F, and officially nicknamed 超级大力士.

Variants

HXD2
The locomotives are designed for heavy haul freight applications (up to  train weights), and to be capable of multiple working of three locomotives.

The locomotive is ballasted to a  axle load - a reduction to  axle load with reduced starting tractive effort is optional.

An (€350 million) order for 180 locomotives was placed (2005), of which the initial 12 would be made in France, then 24 supplied for assembly, the remainder being produced in China. The locomotives are used primarily for coal transportation, specifically on the Datong - Qinhuangdao railway line.

The first China built locomotive was produced May 23, 2007.

In 2010 the locomotives began to be used on coal trains from Inner Mongolia.
Design
The main structural component is an integrated welded steel main bean and floor, with load bearing side sills. The side walls are of corrugated metal, and the roof of the locomotive is removable. The couplers are designed for up to  force.

The drivers cabins are designed for single driver operation.  Driver facilities include a separate air-conditioned/heated area with refrigerator, cooking and washing facilities, and seating and beds.

The locomotives use asynchronous AC electric motor technology, which drives the axles by a nose suspended drive.  The bogies are of welded steel construction, with tractive forces transmitted by a low mounted drawbar.  The electrical system consists of a transformers based on ABB Group products with 4 windings for electric traction power supply per transformer.  Traction inverters are IGBT semiconductor device based, and of the Alstom ONIX type - each traction motor has a separate inverter/rectifier electrical power system.  Electrical power for auxiliary devices is supplied via IGBT converters powered from the same intermediate DC power supply used to power the traction motors.  Computer control and monitoring systems are from the Alstom AGATE product range.

HXD2-1000
In August 2012 CNR Datong announced the production of a new variant of its twin section, 8 axle, 10MW freight locomotive using domestically produced traction and control systems; the first unit was numbered HXD2-1001. The two first units have corrugated sides, following ones have smooth sides.

HXD2-6000
From 2014 CNR Dalian delivered 40 HXD2 quite similar to series HXD2-1000.

HXD2-7000
From 2012 CNR Datong delivered 50 HXD2 quite similar to both first HXD2-1000 at the operator Shenhua Mining. Minor differences in cabin form.

HXD2F

In April 2014 two indigenous two-unit (Bo′Bo′)-(Bo′Bo′) locomotives were unveiled by CNR Datong, nicknamed “超级大力士” (trans. 'Super hercules" or "Super strongman").

HXD2G
In November 2015 two indigenous two-unit (Bo′Bo′)-(Bo′Bo′) locomotives were unveiled by CNR Datong. It is designed for 200 km/h, but first used until 160 km/h.

Related orders
In October 2010 Belorusskaja Železnaja Doroga ordered 12 units of a derived variant of the HXD2 two-section locomotive, to be designated BCG-1.

In 2012 CNR Datong supplied the Chinese mining operation, Shenhua Group, with two , twin section, eight-axle locomotives, with traction equipment supplied by Bombardier. The locomotive type is derived from technology used in the 'Harmony' (HXD) series, and has been named "超级大力士", (literal: "Super Strongman").

See also
 China Railways HXD2B
 China Railways HXD2C
 China Railways 8K,  twin-unit locomotives produced by Alstom for China in the 1980s. see also 8K locomotive (Chinese language)
 Indian locomotive class WAG-12, Indian twin unit locomotives also developed by Alstom using the Prima model.
 List of locomotives in China

Notes

References

Electric locomotives of China
CNR Datong Electric Locomotive Co. locomotives
Alstom Prima electric locomotives
25 kV AC locomotives
Standard gauge locomotives of China
Bo′Bo′+Bo′Bo′ locomotives